Zhang Zhiyun (born December 2, 1999) is a Chinese female acrobatic gymnast. With partner Mo Zhixin, Zhang competed in the 2014 Acrobatic Gymnastics World Championships.

References

1999 births
Living people
Chinese acrobatic gymnasts
Female acrobatic gymnasts